Taras Romanczuk ( also spelled Romanchuk, ; born 14 November 1991) is a Ukrainian-born Polish naturalized football player who plays as a midfielder for Jagiellonia Białystok in the Polish Ekstraklasa.

Career
After starting his youth career for MFK Kovel and BRW-BIK (both Volhynian youth clubs) at Ukrainian Youth Football League, Romanczuk played for Ukrainian mini-football club Apperkot Kovel, making his debut in 2010.

Legionovia Legionowo
In February 2013, he joined Legionovia Legionowo in the II liga in 2013. made his debut on April 13, 2013 during the league match against Zawisza Rzgów, when in the 46th minute he replaced Łukasz Prusik on the pitch. He scored his first goal on June 5, 2013 in a 3-0 league win against GKP Targówek. Legionovia finished that season as the winner of the Polish Third Division, thus ensuring the promotion to the I liga.

Jagiellonia
On 21 July 2014, he joined Polish Ekstraklasa club Jagiellonia Białystok on a one-year contract with the option of extending for another two years  He made his debut on 15 August 2014, replacing Jonatan Straus in the 46th minute of the league match against Legia Warsaw. His first goal for Jagiellonia recorded on 9 November 2014 during 2-5 mach against Ruch Chorzów.

On 2 July 2015 Romanczuk made his European debut in a 1-0 win against FK Kruoja Pakruojis in the UEFA Europa League. In the summer of 2016, Turkish side Konyaspor had a bid rejected for the player. He became vice-captain to the Captain Rafał Grzyb.

During the 2016–17 Ekstraklasa season, Romanczuk impressed helping Jagiellonia Białystok to a runners up finish for the first time in their history in the Ekstraklasa, 2 points behind the winners Legia Warsaw. and at the beginning of January 2017 he was honoured with the award of the best defensive midfielder of Ekstraklasa in 2016. During the 2017–18 Ekstraklasa, he helped reach Jagiellonia Białystok to a 2nd-place finish for the second season running, after finishing 3 points behind to Champions Legia Warsaw.

International career
Romanczuk received Polish citizenship on 15 March 2018 making him eligible for the Polish national team. Taras was called up for friendly's against Nigeria and South Korea subsequently making his debut against South Korea, playing 61 minutes before being subbed for Arkadiusz Milik.

In May 2018, he was a surprise omission from the initial 35 man preliminary Poland squad for the 2018 FIFA World Cup.

Personal life
Romanczuk was born and raised in Ukraine, but has spent all of his professional career in Poland. He also has Polish roots on one side of his family: his great-grandfather was a farmer from Sobibór and his grandmother was born in Włodawa (1939).

He received Polish citizenship in March 2018.

Career statistics

International

References

External links
 
 
 

1991 births
Living people
People from Kovel
Polish footballers
Polish people of Ukrainian descent
Poland international footballers
Ukrainian footballers
Ukrainian people of Polish descent
Ekstraklasa players
Legionovia Legionowo players
Jagiellonia Białystok players
Ukrainian expatriate footballers
Expatriate footballers in Poland
Ukrainian expatriate sportspeople in Poland
Association football midfielders
Ukrainian emigrants to Poland
Citizens of Poland through descent
Sportspeople from Volyn Oblast